The 2004–05 Logan Cup was a first-class cricket competition held in Zimbabwe from 26 October 2004 – 29 April 2005. It was won by Mashonaland, who won five of their six matches to top the table with 97 points.

Points table

References

2004 in Zimbabwean cricket
2005 in Zimbabwean cricket
Domestic cricket competitions in 2004–05
Logan Cup